Antebellum architecture (meaning "prewar", from the Latin ante, "before", and bellum, "war") is the neoclassical architectural style characteristic of the 19th-century Southern United States, especially the Deep South, from after the birth of the United States with the American Revolution, to the start of the American Civil War. Antebellum architecture is especially characterized by Georgian, Neo-classical, and Greek Revival style homes and mansions. These plantation houses were built in the southern American states during roughly the thirty years before the American Civil War; approximately between the 1830s to 1860s.

Key features
Exterior: The main characteristics of antebellum architecture viewed from the outside of the house often included huge pillars, a balcony that ran along the whole outside edge of the house created a porch that offers shade and a sitting area, evenly spaced large windows, and big center entrances at the front and rear of the house to add to the box-like style of the mansion. A hipped or gabled roof are characteristics of antebellum architecture and often feature a cupola. A cupola is a dome-like structure on top of a building. It is functional as it provides ventilation but is also decorative. These mansions also often included grand gardens with geometrically cut bushes to complement the symmetry of the house. Antebellum architectural structures have multiple stories or levels.

Interior: The interior of these mansions were just as extravagant as the outside. Common features included enormous foyers, sweeping open stairways, ballrooms, grand dining rooms, and intricate design work. The design work included intricate shapes and patterns made from plaster used to adorn walls and furniture. It was also used to create wood and floor designs. Designs additionally include friezes, large pier mirrors, and marble mantels.  

Greek revival components apparent in antebellum architecture includes doorways often recessed and glorified by columns of correct proportions, appropriate pilasters, and heavy entablatures.

Similarly, Georgian architecture is illustrated similarly with highly decorated entrances flanked by thin colonnades including a lunette over the door.

Examples

Many plantation houses still standing are of this style, including:
Aduston Hall in Gainesville, Alabama
Arlington House, The Robert E. Lee Memorial in Arlington, Virginia
Barrington Hall in Roswell, Georgia
Belle Grove Plantation in Iberville Parish, Louisiana, the largest plantation house ever built in the South.
Belle Meade Plantation in Belle Meade, Tennessee
Bermuda Hill in Prairieville, Alabama
Berry Hill Plantation in South Boston, Virginia
Boone Hall, near Charleston, South Carolina; built in 1936, but in the antebellum style.
Bulloch Hall in Roswell, Georgia
Carnton Plantation in Franklin, Tennessee
Evergreen Plantation in Wallace, Louisiana
Gamble Plantation Historic State Park in Ellenton, Florida
Glen Mary Plantation in Sparta, Georgia
Goodman-LeGrand House in Tyler, Texas
Hunter-Dawson Home in New Madrid, Missouri
Lansdowne in Natchez, Mississippi
Longwood in Natchez, Mississippi
Millford Plantation in Pinewood, South Carolina
Monmouth Plantation, in Natchez, Mississippi
Myrtles Plantation, in St. Francisville, Louisiana
Nottoway Plantation in White Castle, Louisiana
Oak Alley Plantation in Vacherie, Louisiana
Orton Plantation in Brunswick County, North Carolina
Rippavilla Plantation in Spring Hill, Tennessee
Rosedown Plantation in St. Francisville, Louisiana
The Grove Plantation in Tallahassee, Florida
The Hermitage, near Nashville, Tennessee
Ward Hall in Georgetown, Kentucky
Waverley in West Point, Mississippi

History
The features associated with antebellum architecture were introduced by people of European descent who settled in the Southern states during the colonial period and in U.S. territories after the Louisiana Purchase of 1803 along with a wave of immigration from Europe in 1812. Great numbers of Europeans seeking economic opportunities emigrated to America after Napoleon's  defeat and the end of the war of 1812. This new wave of entrepreneurs began to dominate not only the economy, but also the architecture of the first half of the 19th century.

A prime example of the influence of immigrants in antebellum architecture is Stanton Hall.  The Hall was built by Frederick Stanton, an immigrant from Ireland who made his fortune in trading cotton.  The design was based on the Revival style.  The Hall also goes to show the increasingly connected national and global economy in which antebellum architecture emerged.  The house used mantel pieces from New York, gasoliers from Philadelphia, and mirrors from France.  Similar to many antebellum homes, Stanton Hall was built using a fortune Stanton made trading cotton. During the Civil War, like many other plantation houses, the Hall was occupied by Union soldiers.

President Andrew Jackson's home the Hermitage is another prime example of both antebellum architecture and the social conditions in which it arose. It was built in the Federal Style which, while losing favor in the more trendy East, was still popular in Western slave states like Tennessee. Later, renovations made the house more in line with contemporary styles, adding Doric columns and making it more Classical and Revivalist in appearance. Like other homes of its time, the Hermitage was built in a symmetrical design with equal amounts of corridors and rooms.  Not just reflecting the cultural differences between the West and East in this time, the Hermitage also was part of the South's economy. The Hermitage was an active plantation which grew the period's dominant cash crop, cotton.

Georgia's Old Governor's Mansion is one of the finest examples of the High Greek Revival architecture of this period. The mansion, located in Milledgeville, was designed by Charles Cluskey, an Irish immigrant who emigrated to New York City in 1827 where he trained to be an architect under the firm Town and Davis, and was built by Timothy Porter in 1839. Like other antebellum homes, this mansion has Ionic columns, a covered porch, and symmetrically placed windows. For over thirty years, this mansion housed many Georgian chief executives such as George Crawford, Howell Cobb and Joseph E. Brown. It was used as a stage for their speeches, and a place to introduce important guests. This mansion also played a part in the Civil War; General William T. Sherman headquartered in the building in 1864 and it was claimed as a prize in the "March to the Sea." After the war, the mansion was abandoned when Georgia's government was moved to Atlanta.

After the Civil War, the upkeep of these homes was strained. Stanton Hall, for example, was owned by the descendants of Stanton for several decades after the Civil War, but eventually the financial burden was too much and it became the Stanton College for Young Ladies.

Today most antebellum buildings serve as museums.  These museums, especially the museums located at former plantations, often attempt to show both sides of the architectural style.  While celebrating the beauty of the buildings, they also tell the story of the slaves who worked the land.  Boone Hall is a prime example of modern antebellum museums.  The museum uses nine of the original slave cabins built between 1790 and 1810 as part of its "Black History in America" exhibit.  In the exhibit, each cabin presents different aspects of slave life on the plantation.  While the style's history remains controversial, exhibits like these are important in exposing the public to America's history with slavery.

In modern society 
An estimated 20% of antebellum mansions remain intact in the south today due to many being burned during the Civil War, natural disasters, and their neglect. 
Many antebellum homes are now museums; Georgia's Old Governor's Mansion is an example of this. The mansion belongs to Georgia College, and is its most treasured structure. In 2001, the structure began its restoration, and now serves as a museum that exhibits artefacts and gardens that showcase its history. Tours are available today that focus on the history of the building, gardens, and artefacts. The mansion was declared a National Historic Landmark in 1973.

In 2005, Hurricane Katrina struck Louisiana and Mississippi. Its effects damaged or destroyed many antebellum buildings throughout the South. This destruction once again raised the question of whether or not these buildings, as symbols of a wealthy society propped up by slavery, should be preserved.  For example, Grass Lawn, an antebellum mansion in Gulfport, Mississippi, was totally destroyed by the hurricane.  As the community began to raise funds to rebuild the mansion, it faced resistance from parts of the community who opposed the symbolism of the mansion.  Though it eventually passed through city council, the bill funding the reconstruction was at first even voted down.

Many prime example of antebellum architecture did not receive the same support as Grass Lawn.  In the wake of Katrina, cleanups of cities often did not follow the guidelines of the National Historic Preservation Act.  Hundreds of properties were destroyed with little hope of being reconstructed or commemorated. There are movements however, to preserve these historic properties. FEMA (Federal Emergency Management Agency) for example helps to preserve important architectural properties, especially those affected by Katrina.

See also
Pre-war architecture
John Scudder

References

 
American architectural styles
House styles
 Antebellum
 Antebellum
Slave cabins and quarters in the United States
Antebellum South